Robert Crofton Brown (16 May 1921 – 3 September 1996) was an English Labour Party politician.

Brown was a district gas inspector with the Northern Gas Board and a branch secretary of the National Union of General and Municipal Workers. He was secretary of his Constituency Labour Party and a councillor on Newcastle upon Tyne Borough Council.

Brown was elected as the Member of Parliament (MP) for Newcastle upon Tyne West in 1966, then following boundary changes, for Newcastle upon Tyne North from 1983, retiring in 1987.

References

External links 
 

1921 births
1996 deaths
Labour Party (UK) MPs for English constituencies
Councillors in Tyne and Wear
GMB (trade union)-sponsored MPs
UK MPs 1966–1970
UK MPs 1970–1974
UK MPs 1974
UK MPs 1974–1979
UK MPs 1979–1983
UK MPs 1983–1987
Ministers in the Wilson governments, 1964–1970